The men's 56 kg weightlifting event was one of the event at the weightlifting competition of the 1988 Summer Olympics, limiting competitors to a maximum of 56 kilograms of body mass. The competition took place on 19 September, and participants were divided in two groups.

Each lifter performed in both the snatch and clean and jerk lifts, with the final score being the sum of the lifter's best result in each. The athlete received three attempts in each of the two lifts; the score for the lift was the heaviest weight successfully lifted.

Mitko Grablev originally won this category, but he was disqualified after he tested positive for furosemide.

Results

References

Sources

Weightlifting at the 1988 Summer Olympics